This is the results breakdown of the local elections held in the Community of Madrid on 13 June 1999. The following tables show detailed results in the autonomous community's most populous municipalities, sorted alphabetically.

Overall

City control
The following table lists party control in the most populous municipalities, including provincial capitals (shown in bold). Gains for a party are displayed with the cell's background shaded in that party's colour.

Municipalities

Alcalá de Henares
Population: 163,831

Alcobendas
Population: 86,146

Alcorcón
Population: 143,970

Coslada
Population: 73,732

Fuenlabrada
Population: 167,458

Getafe
Population: 143,629

Leganés
Population: 173,163

Madrid

Population: 2,881,506

Móstoles
Population: 195,311

Parla
Population: 71,396

Torrejón de Ardoz
Population: 91,186

See also
1999 Madrilenian regional election

References

Madrid
1999